The genus Norellia are small to medium sized predatory flies. Most of the species formally placed in this genus are now in the genus Norellisoma.

Species
N. spinipes (Meigen, 1826) The Daffodil Fly

References

Scathophagidae
Muscoidea genera
Taxa named by Jean-Baptiste Robineau-Desvoidy